Metro Report International is a business journal for urban transport professionals which covers the metro, light rail, tram and commuter rail industries worldwide. It includes news and articles looking at urban transport around the world, with maps and project data. Coverage of the rolling stock market includes detailed listings of metro car and low-floor tram orders. News is published online, with the printed magazine issued twice per year.

History

Metro Report International began as Developing Metros, which was launched in 1985 as an annual supplement to Railway Gazette International. Developing Metros was renamed Metro Report in 1998, and to Metro Report International in 2008.

Metro Report International is part of the Railway Gazette Group within DVV Media Group, which is part of the Hamburg-based Deutsche Verkehrs Verlag group.

See also
 Railway Gazette International
 Rail Business Intelligence

References

External links
 

Rail transport magazines published in the United Kingdom
Quarterly magazines published in the United Kingdom
Magazines established in 1985
Business magazines published in the United Kingdom
Annual magazines published in the United Kingdom
1985 establishments in England